Phi Lambda Theta was a social fraternity founded at Pennsylvania State College in 1920 for students who belonged to the Independent Order of Odd Fellows. It was originally named Three Links.

History

November 18, 1920, is designated as Founders' Day as on that date the body first met as an organization officially recognized by the Pennsylvania College college board on fraternity affairs. 
The name was changed from Three Links to Phi Lambda Theta on May 11, 1922. Modification of the non-college lodge requirement was effected on September 13, 1922, and all lodge affiliations and connections were severed in January, 1924.

In 1930 it was admitted to Junior membership in the North American Interfraternity Conference.

Chapters
These were the chapters of Phi Lambda Theta.  All were active at dissolution:

Dissolution
Rather than a coordinated merger strategy, dissolution of Phi Lambda Theta appears to have been a sudden rush for the door, late in the Great Depression. The Kansas State and Susquehanna chapters became chapters of Beta Kappa in  through separate petitions, and the founding chapter was absorbed into Alpha Tau Omega. Shortly after these departures the chapter at Bucknell became a local under that name. In  it would join Chi Phi as the Phi Lambda Theta chapter. Meanwhile, the Waynesburg chapter opted for Kappa Sigma Kappa, its home for 18 years in what looked to be the fourth of the scattered nationals. Thus eventually, three of 's five chapters were absorbed by Theta Chi, considering mergers.

References

Defunct former members of the North American Interfraternity Conference
Student organizations established in 1920
1920 establishments in Pennsylvania